The Dugger and Schultz Millinery Store Building was a historic commercial building at the southwest corner of Glade and Nome Streets in Marshall, Arkansas.  It was a single-story structure, built out of rusticated stone in the style typical of the Ozark Mountains.  The rounded-arch openings of the facade, the entrance recessed in the rightmost, gave the building a Romanesque Revival flavor.  It was built in 1905 by Frazier Ashley, a local stonemason, and initially housed a hatmaker's shop.

The building was listed on the National Register of Historic Places in 1993.  It was subsequently demolished to make way for Marshall's new post office, and was delisted in 2018.

See also
National Register of Historic Places listings in Searcy County, Arkansas

References

Commercial buildings on the National Register of Historic Places in Arkansas
Romanesque Revival architecture in Arkansas
Commercial buildings completed in 1905
Buildings and structures in Searcy County, Arkansas
National Register of Historic Places in Searcy County, Arkansas
Former National Register of Historic Places in Arkansas
1905 establishments in Arkansas